Rich Mountain Bald (variant: Bald of Rich Mountain and Big Bald of Rich) is a mountain in the North Carolina High Country, southeast of the community of Zionville.  Its elevation reaches .

The mountain generates several feeder streams to the South Fork New River (via Meat Camp Creek) and Watauga River (via Cove Creek).  Rich Mountain Gap separates it with Snake Mountain.

References

External links
 Rich Mountain Bald on Peakbagger.

Mountains of North Carolina
Mountains of Watauga County, North Carolina